Walter Ivan Sackville Craig (22 February 1912 – 7 March 1995) was a British (Scottish) actor, the son of Dr. Eric S. Craig and Dorothy Gertrude Meldrum.

Ivan Craig was born in Edinburgh. In 1940 he married Lilian May Davies, a fashion model, who later became Princess Lilian of Sweden. Soon afterwards they were separated by the war, when Craig was drafted into the army and posted to North Africa. They divorced amicably on 7 November 1947.

Filmography
 Just William's Luck (1948) - The Boss' Gang
 Panic at Madame Tussaud's (1948) - Anthony Carter
 William Comes to Town (1948) - 1st Carter
 Murder at the Windmill (1949) - Policeman #2
 Skimpy in the Navy (1949) - (uncredited)
 Miss Pilgrim's Progress (1949) - Town Planner (uncredited)
 You Can't Fool an Irishman (1949) - (uncredited)
 High Jinks in Society (1949) - Watkins' Accomplice (uncredited)
 A Matter of Murder (1949) - Tony
 The Body Said No! (1950) - Derek
 Dangerous Assignment (1950) - Frank Mayer
 A Tale of Five Cities (1951) 
 The Six Men (1951) - Wainwright
 The Story of Robin Hood and His Merrie Men (1952) - Merry man.
 Girdle of Gold (1952) - Hotel Detective
 Stryker of the Yard (1953) 
 Hell Below Zero (1954) - Larsen
 Profile (1954) - Jerry Haymer
 The Devil's Jest (1954) - Maj. Seton
 A Prize of Gold (1955) - British Major
 The Flying Eye (1955) - Mayer
 Man of the Moment (1955) - Miguel (uncredited)
 Robbery with Violence (1958) - Peter Frayne
 Jackpot (1960) - Dinty

Television
 The Gay Cavalier (1957) - Major Mould.
 Ivanhoe (1958) -  Lord Blackheath.

Stage
 Lady Precious Stream (1934/5) - Reader (Little Theatre transferring to the Savoy)
 The Rose Without a Thorn (1933/4) - Paris (Duke of York's transferring to Vaudeville)
 Murder Happens by Arnold Ridley (1950) (Gateway Theatre, London)

References

External links
 

1912 births
1995 deaths
Scottish male stage actors
Scottish male film actors
Scottish male television actors
20th-century Scottish male actors
British Army personnel of World War II